The list of ship launches in 1671 includes a chronological list of some ships launched in 1671.


References

1671
Ship launches